Bertil Lennart Söderberg (born 10 June 1947) is a former Swedish handball player who competed in the 1972 Summer Olympics.

Clubs
Born in Gothenburg Bertil Söderberg played handboll in Västra Frölunda IF from 1965-1973. 1970 the club advanced to the highest swedish league. After two years in "Allsvenskan" he shifted club to IFK Lidingö where he played for five or six seasons. He changed club to SOIK Hellas but only for two seasons. His last club were GF Kroppskultur.

National team
Bertil Söderberg played 88 matches for the national team  1967 to 1977. First match in National team 9 April 1967 on Island against Island. Last match 30 October 1977 against Danmark. In 1972 he was part of the Swedish team which finished seventh in the Olympic tournament. He played five matches and scored six goals.

References

1947 births
Living people
Swedish male handball players
Olympic handball players of Sweden
Handball players at the 1972 Summer Olympics